Megachile cartagenensis is a species of bee in the family Megachilidae. It was described by Mitchell in 1930.

References

Cartagenensis
Insects described in 1930